null or n|u is a registered not-for-profit society and an active security community with 13 chapters in major cities - Bangalore, Mumbai, Chennai, Pune, Hyderabad, Delhi, Chandigarh, Kolkata, Singapore, Bhopal, Dharamshala, Dubai and Amsterdam. An open security community that was founded in 2010 with the idea of providing an integrated platform for exchanging information on the latest attack vectors, zero day vulnerabilities and unknown threats. The community is formed by members from security background with experience in corporate world. null is about spreading information security awareness. All our activities such as null Monthly Meets, null Humla, null Bachaav, null Puliya, null Job Portal are for the cause of that.

null community events are often held in tandem with other information Security Communities and organisations like OWASP. And G4H (Garage for Hackers).

News, conferences and meetups of the community are shared on their website https://null.community.

Activities 
null Humla -  (Humla in Hindi means to Attack) null Humla is a workshop theme which is focused towards teaching the information security community the offensive skills of security.

null Bachaav - (Bachaav in Hindi means to Prevent) null Bachaav is a workshop theme which is focused towards teaching the information security community the defensive skills of security.

null Puliya - (Puliya in Hindi means a short bridge) null Puliya is a concept  of workshops which aims at bridging the skill gaps of professionals for working in information security.

null Workshop - null Workshop is a workshop theme which is focused towards teaching the information security community the security aspects in terms of programming and tool usage. The workshops may extend in parts depending upon the content to be covered.

null Jobs Portal - null jobs portal (https://jobs.null.co.in) is a community initiative in which employers can post security related jobs on this portal and candidates looking for jobs in security can apply directly from here. This is free for both employers and candidates.

null meetups - These are open and free meetups for the community members where they gather at a common place once in a month, to discuss and share information about various topics related to information security.

References 

2010 establishments in India